The national flag of the Democratic Republic of the Congo is a sky blue flag, adorned with a yellow star in the upper left canton and cut diagonally by a red stripe with a yellow fimbriation. It was adopted on 18 February 2006. A new constitution, ratified in December 2005 and which came into effect in February 2006, promoted a return to a flag similar to that flown between 1963 and 1971, with a change from a royal blue to sky blue background.  Blue represents peace. Red stands for "the blood of the country's martyrs", yellow the country's wealth; and the star symbol the future for the country. It is one of the few national flags incorporating a diagonal line, with other examples including Tanzania, Namibia, Trinidad and Tobago, and Brunei.

Colours
The colours approximation is listed below:

Previous flags
The previous flag was adopted in 2003. It was similar to the flag used between 1960 and 1963. That flag, in turn, was based on the flag which was originally used by King Leopold's Association Internationale Africaine and was first used in 1877. The 1877 design featured a yellow star on a blue background. The 1877 flag continued as the flag of the Congo Free State after the territory was recognized as an official possession of Leopold II at the Berlin Conference.

After gaining independence from Belgium on 30 June 1960, the same basic design was maintained.  However, six smaller stars were added to the hoist to symbolise the six provinces of the country at the time. This design was used only from 1960 to 1963.

The flag of the second Republic of Mobutu Sese Seko became the official banner after Mobutu established his dictatorship. This flag was used from 1966 to 1971 and consisted of the same yellow star, now made smaller, situated in the top corner of the hoist side, with a red, yellow-lined band running diagonally across the center. The red symbolized the people's blood; the yellow symbolized prosperity; the blue symbolized hope; and the star represented unity.

The flag changed again when the country was renamed Zaire in 1971. The Zaire flag was created as part of Mobutu's attempted re-Africanization of the nation and was used officially until Mobutu's overthrow in the First Congo War. The flag of Zaire was also used as the political-party flag of the Popular Movement of the Revolution, led by Mobutu.

In 1997, when the Mobutu government was overthrown and the country assumed its current designation of Democratic Republic of the Congo, the country reverted to 1960s post-independence design, featuring a single large star and six smaller stars. In 2003, the most recent change before the adoption of the current flag, the flag's color was modified to use a lighter shade of blue.

See also
 Emblem of the Democratic Republic of the Congo
 List of flags of the Democratic Republic of the Congo

References

National symbols of the Democratic Republic of the Congo
Democratic Republic of the Congo
Congo, Democratic Republic of
Congo, Democratic Republic